CACM may refer to:
California Association of Community Managers, one of the certifying agencies of the Certified Community Association Manager.
Central American Common Market
Certified Associate Contracts Manager, a former certification from the National Contract Management Association that is now called "Certified Federal Contracts Manager"
Communications of the ACM